Claudine de La Tour-Turenne (1520–1591) was a lady-in-waiting of Marguerite de Valois (1553–1615), the spouse of the French king Henri IV (1553–1610). By birth, she was member of the House of La Tour d'Auvergne.

Early life
She was born in 1520 as the eldest child of François II de la Tour, Vicomte de Turenne (1497-1532) and his second wife Anne de La Tour de Boulogne, Dame de Montgascon (1492-1530).

Marriage
On October 31, 1535, Claudine married, at the age of 15, Justus II, seigneur of Tournon and count of Roussillon (1510–1557). They had a son and a number of daughters:

 Just Louis IV de Tournon, Count de Roussillon, Baron de Durteil (d. 1617), married Madeleine de La Rochefoucauld. They had two daughters:
 Madeleine; married to Gaspard d'Alègre, Seigneur de Beauvoir; no issue
 Francoise (b. 1621); married to Gaspard de Polignac, Vicomte de Polignac, Marquis de Chalencon (1579-1659). They were ancestors of Dukes of Polignac and House of Monaco.
 Claudine de Tournon-Roussillon (d. 1586), married Philibert de Rye, Count de Varax (d. 1597). They had at least six children:
 Claude de Rye, baron of Balançon, appointed gentilhombre de la cámara to the Cardinal-Infant on 2 May 1635, married Claudine-Prospère de la Baume; daughters Madeleine and Eléonore were ladies-in-waiting to Isabella Clara Eugenia, sovereign of the Netherlands.
 François de Rye, sumilher da cortina of the archdukes in 1606.
 Christophe de Rye de La Palud, Count de Varax (d. 1637); married Eleonore de Chabot (1570-1618); had issue.
 Anne-Marguerite de Rye, married Guillaume de Richardot, baron of Lembeek and later count of Galmaarden.
 Antoinette de Rye, married Gaspar, the uncle of Ferdinand le Blanc d'Andelot
 Alexandrine de Rye (1589-1666); married Count Leonhard II von Taxis (1594-1628). They were progenitors of the House of Thurn und Taxis.
Hélène de Tournon, a maid of honour to Margeruite de Valois; died of a sudden illness as Marguerite and her retinue were traveling by boat through the bishopric of Liège.

Legacy 
It has been suggested that the references to "bright queen Margot" and "Claudine" in Mikhail Bulgakov's novel The Master and Margarita are references to Claudine, mother for a large family and widowed at 37, and Marguerite.

References 

1520 births
1591 deaths